The Talang Tuo inscription is a 7th-century Srivijaya inscription discovered by Louis Constant Westenenk on 17 November 1920, on the foot of Bukit Seguntang near Palembang.

This inscription tells about the establishment of the bountiful Śrīksetra park awarded by Sri Jayanasa the king of Srivijaya, for the well being of all creatures.

The inscription was discovered in good condition with clearly inscribed scripts. Its size is 50 cm × 80 cm. It is a stone block and it is dated from 606 Saka (corresponds to 23 March 684), written Pallava script in Old Malay. The inscription consists of 14 lines. Van Ronkel and Bosch are the first scholars who translated the inscription. Their work was published in Acta Orientalia. Since 1920, the inscription has been stored in National Museum of Indonesia, Jakarta, under inventory number D.145.

Content  
The writings on the Talang Tuwo inscription:

Translation 
The translation according to George Cœdès.

Old Malay vocabulary 
The inscription is among the earliest evidence of written archaic Old Malay language. Many words are still recognizable and intelligible with Modern Malay (including Indonesian and Malaysian variants). The most significant differences are found in verbal affixes. While modern Malay and Indonesian use the prefix di- to mark passive, in Old Malay we find ni-. The same holds for the active prefix men- corresponding to Old Malay mar- or ma-. The modern possessive and object suffix -nya corresponds to the Old Malay -na. Old Malay words and their modern Malay and Indonesian counterparts are listed below, followed by their English gloss.

  =  = moon
  = tatkalanya = while, during
  = ini =  this
  = temu, bertemu = meet
  = diperbuat = performed
  = sebanyaknya = amount of
  = ditanam = planted
  = di sini = here
  = nyiur = palm tree
  = enau = Arenga plant
  = rumbia = Arenga fibers

  = dengan = with
  = dimakan = being eaten
  = buahnya = fruits
  = tetapi = but
  = rajin = diligent
  = tahu = to know (knowledge)
  = aur = aur (a type of bamboo)
  = buluh = vines, may also means bamboo
  = betung (a type of bamboo)
  = telaga = pond, small lake

  = punyanya = belong to
  = marga = clan
  = suka = happiness, like
  = air = water
  = diminumnya = being drink
  = sebanyaknya, sebanyak-banyaknya = as many as possible
  = buatnya = for them
  = huma = dry rice field or orchard
  = menghidupi = to bring life

  = perkara = issue, problem
  = barang = item
  = buatannya = made
  = curi (pencuri) = steal (thieve)
  = membangun = built
  = hyang = spirit or gods
  = tetapi = but
  = rancak (preserved in Minang) = beautiful, good
  = rupa = look, form
  = laki-laki = man/men

See also 
 Kedukan Bukit Inscription
 Telaga Batu inscription
 Kota Kapur Inscription

References

Srivijaya
Inscriptions in Indonesia
7th-century inscriptions
National Museum of Indonesia
History of Sumatra
Malay inscriptions